Henrik Drabløs Lødøen (born 20 October 1991 in Brattvåg, Norway) is a Norwegian jazz drummer.

Career 
Lødøen got his diploma from the jazz program at the Norwegian University of Science and Technology in 2015. In Trondheim he started collaborations with a number of the up coming young Norwegian and swedish jazz musicians. Among them are Megalodon Collective, Stig Ulv, DRØM, Rohey, Ósk and Les Casanovas.

Honors 
2016: Winner of Jazzintro at the 2016 Moldejazz with Megalodon Collective
2016: Nominated for best jazz album at Spellemann (norwegian grammys) with Megalodon Collective
2018: Nominated for best newcomer of the year at Spellemann (norwegian grammys) with Rohey

Discography 

Med Megalodon Collective
2015: Megalodon (Gigafon Records)
2017: Animals (Jazzland Recordings) 
2019: The Triumph (Jazzland Recordings)

Med Rohey
2017: A Million Things (Jazzland Recordings)

Med Siril Malmedal Hauge

2019: Uncharted Territory (Jazzland Recordings)
2021: Slowly, slowly (Jazzland Recordings)

Med Rikke Normann
 2021: the art of letting go (RikkiLeaks)

Med Louien

 2019: None of My Words (Jansen Records)Med Mosambique

2019: Big City Moves (Jazzland Recordings)

Med Jul på Sunnmørsk

2018: Jul på Sunnmørsk (Dugnad Rec)Med Stein Helge Solstad

2018: Elvane MøtastMed DRØM

2017: Drømmen Om Oss (Vilje)

Med Lillebror
2017: Lillebror (Alf Prøysen-viser) (Grappa) 
Med Stig Ulv
2012: Strengetonar (Self-release)
2013: Klimprar (Self-release)

Med Circuit Of Values
2012: Digital'' (Self-release)

References

External links 
MEGALODON COLLECTIVE LIVE on YouTube
Les Casanovas @ Ila Brannstasjon 1 on YouTube
Vuku – Walter on YouTube

21st-century Norwegian drummers
Norwegian jazz drummers
Male drummers
Norwegian percussionists
Norwegian University of Science and Technology alumni
Norwegian composers
Norwegian male composers
1991 births
Living people
People from Haram, Norway
21st-century Norwegian male musicians
Male jazz musicians